Duriez is a surname. Notable people with the surname include:

 Colin Duriez (born 1947), English writer
 Marcel Duriez (1940–2023), French hurdler
 Odette Duriez (born 1948), French politician